15029/15030 Gorakhpur–Pune Weekly Express is the Express train of the Indian Railways connecting Pune in Maharashtra and Gorakhpur via Basti of Uttar Pradesh.

It has inaugurated at Thursday 26 March 2015. At any given time the 15029 Gorakhpur - Pune Weekly Express always gets the normal priority like other express, on any line.

The 15029/15030 Gorakhpur - Pune weekly Express left Gorakhpur Junction railway station for Pune Junction railway station, to cover a distance of   km in 34 hours 40 mins. It had a 1-1 AC 2&3-Tier and 8 3-Tier Sleeper. Also, the train is the third Express Train between Gorakhpur Junction railway station to Pune Junction railway station in India and other all trains are Express.

History
This train began in March 2015.

Accommodations

Gorakhpur-Pune is the express train to have One AC-2 TIER Coaches, One AC 3 TIER Coaches, Eight 3 TIER SLEEPER Coaches, Five GEN Coaches and  Tow SLR Coaches. The trains have normal priority on the Indian railway network. The trains offer four classes of accommodation: Second Class AC 2-Tier (bays of 4 berths + 2 berth on the side) with open system berth, Second Class AC 3-Tier (bays of 6 berths + 2 berths on the side) it also with open system berth and Second class 3 Tier sleeper (bays of 6 berths + 2 berths on the side). Generally it has 1 AC 2-Tiers and 1 AC 3-Tiers ( both of which may be increased according to demand), it has 8 Second class 3 Tier sleeper(which may be increased according to demand), it has no pantry car, 5 GEN (Unreserved) and 2 SLR (Second-class Luggage/parcel van + guard van ('G' missing). See note for 'GS' above.)

route
15029 Gorakhpur - Pune Weekly Express leaves Gorakhpur Junction on a weekly basis and reaches Pune Junction on the 3rd day.

15030 Gorakhpur - Pune Weekly Express leaves Pune Junction on a weekly basis and reaches Gorakhpur Junction on the 2nd day.

On this route, the train covers a distance of    in 34 hrs 40 mins.

Coach composition

See also

Express trains in India
List of named passenger trains of India

References

Passenger trains originating from Gorakhpur
Transport in Pune
Railway services introduced in 2015
Express trains in India
Rail transport in Maharashtra
Rail transport in Madhya Pradesh